Hausvogteiplatz is a Berlin U-Bahn station on line U2, located in Mitte. The eponymous square, former site of a bastion of the historic city fortification, was named after the Prussian aulic court and prison. In the late 19th century it had developed as a centre of Berlin's clothing industry.

The station, designed by Alfred Grenander, opened on 1 October 1908 with Berlin's second U-Bahn line, running from Potsdamer Platz on the initial Stammstrecke route to Spittelmarkt. During an air raid on 3 February 1945 it was devastated by a direct bomb hit and could not be reopened until 1950.

References

External links
 www.hausvogteiplatz.de (in German)

U2 (Berlin U-Bahn) stations
Buildings and structures in Mitte
Railway stations in Germany opened in 1908